was a  of the Imperial Japanese Navy.

Design and description
The Yūgumo class was a repeat of the preceding  with minor improvements that increased their anti-aircraft capabilities. Their crew numbered 228 officers and enlisted men. The ships had two Kampon geared steam turbines, each driving one propeller shaft, using steam provided by three Kampon water-tube boilers.

The main armament of the Yūgumo class consisted of six Type 3  guns in three twin-gun turrets, one superfiring pair aft and one turret forward of the superstructure. The guns were able to elevate up to 75° to increase their ability against aircraft, but their slow rate of fire, slow traversing speed, and the lack of any sort of high-angle fire-control system meant that they were virtually useless as anti-aircraft guns. They were built with four Type 96  anti-aircraft guns in two twin-gun mounts, but more of these guns were added over the course of the war. The ships were also armed with eight  torpedo tubes in a two quadruple traversing mounts; one reload was carried for each tube. Their anti-submarine weapons comprised two depth charge throwers for which 36 depth charges were carried.

Construction and career
Kishinami assisted in sinking the submarine  on 29 February 1944. At the Battle of the Philippine Sea, she was assigned to the Van Force. In the Battle of Leyte Gulf the ship was assigned to the 1st Diversion Attack Force. She rescued survivors of the sinking cruiser , including Vice Admiral Takeo Kurita. The destroyer suffered minor damage from near misses and strafing on 24–25 October. The ship was repaired at Singapore in mid-November.

On 2 December 1944, Kishinami departed Manila, escorting Hakko Maru back to Singapore. Ninety members of her crew were killed, including Commander Mifune; 150 survivors rescued by Yurishima and CD-17. Also among the dead was Ensign Susumu Nagumo, son of Vice Admiral Chuichi Nagumo.

On 10 January 1945, Kishinami was removed from the Navy List.

Notes

References

External links
 CombinedFleet.com: Yūgumo-class destroyers
 CombinedFleet.com: Kishinami history

Yūgumo-class destroyers
World War II destroyers of Japan
Ships sunk by American submarines
Shipwrecks in the Philippine Sea
1943 ships
Maritime incidents in December 1944
Ships built by Uraga Dock Company